Rochester Independent College (RIC) is an Independent Schools Council accredited co-educational, private day and boarding school, in Rochester, United Kingdom. It was established in 1984.

History 
Opened in 1984 by mathematicians Brian Pain and Simon de Belder, the college was known as Rochester Tutors and was predominantly 6th form, teaching A levels and retakes. Gradually over the next 3 decades the campus grew to 14 (mainly) listed buildings in the heart of Rochester and changed its name to Rochester Independent College. The Lower School was opened in 2007.
 
The college mascot is the flying pig, a riposte to the cynicism which greeted the college’s chances of success when it was founded.
  
The college joined the Dukes Education Group in 2016.

Campus 
It started as one terraced house, but as the school expanded, it gradually bought up 14 (mainly) listed buildings in the heart of a designated conservation area.
 
The college's facilities include a theatre, Science Labs, a photography block, a MUGA area for sport, a gym, two canteens and a performance area.

A pair of steel sculptural musical gates leads to the grounds. The gates are an art installation created by Henry Dagg, sound sculptor, experimental musical instrument builder and Bjork collaborator. Standing almost four metres tall and eight metres wide across the structure is designed to make music with vibraphone bars, tubular bells, and organ pipe-like tubes with resonating strings that can be plucked, struck or bowed.
Medway Council refused planning permission for the gates in 2004 on the grounds of noise pollution, but this was overturned by a government inspector.

Students 

The school has a total of about 230 students, with a relatively even mix of boys and girls. About 120 students are boarders and the rest are day students from the local area.

Approximately 25% of the sixth form students are international from countries such as Thailand, Italy, Spain, China, Hong Kong, Nigeria, and Russia. Of the 230 students in the Sixth Form, around 40 will have stayed on from Years 7–11. The majority join from other schools after taking their GCSEs.

Students from Thailand join the College each year funded by the Royal Thai Government Scholarship programme for A level courses.

Staff 

The College staff includes practising photographers, graphic designers, fine artists and musicians. Former tutors include BAFTA award-winning film director Clio Barnard and artist and musician Billy Childish.

Curriculum 

Students in the Sixth Form study A levels choosing their subjects from a list of nearly 40.

The College also offers intensive one-year GCSE and A Level courses as well as retake programmes. From 2020 the college offered Digital Media and Design as a new subject.

Lower School – Years 7–11 

The Lower School is located in New Road House, on the main college campus. It is co-educational and the principal entry point is at Year 7 but there is flexible entry throughout the school. It took its first pupils in September 2007. There are a maximum of 12 in each class.

The Lower School is non-selective. The majority of students are from the UK. Student numbers are about 120.

Inspection judgements

The school was inspected by Ofsted in 2008, and judged Good. Since then the responsibility for assessment has passed to ISI.

Accreditation 

Rochester Independent College is affiliated to the Independent Schools Council (ISC) and a member of the Independent Schools Association (ISA). The college is also a member of British Boarding Schools Connected.

References

External links
Rochester Independent College website
Alternative Education High School
Boarding School Fee Comparison From The Observer Magazine.
Full Ofsted Inspection Report.
Liz Lightfoot Feature Article from The Independent
Good Schools Guide Review 2014

Boarding schools in Kent
Educational institutions established in 1984
Private schools in Medway
Rochester, Kent
1984 establishments in England